Lukhmi is a typical mince savoury or starter of the cuisine of Hyderabad, Telangana, India. It is a local variation of samosa. The snack's authentic preparation includes stuffing with mutton-mince kheema (ground meat). It is a non-vegetarian derivative of the samosa although, unlike the latter, the lukhmi is shaped into a flat square patty.

The word comes from loqma or morsel.

Ingredients
Mince meat (kheema), flour and yogurt.

Preparation
Prepare the dough in yogurt, mixing it thoroughly until it becomes very smooth, and stuff it with minced meat.

Kheemey-ki-Lukhmi is still served as a starter in the authentic Hyderabadi weddings and other celebrations.

See also
Hyderabadi cuisine
Hyderabadi biryani
Hyderabadi haleem

References

Further reading
 A Princely Legacy, Hyderabadi Cuisine By Pratibha Karan ,

External links

Chicken lukmi recipe

Indian snack foods
Indian fast food
Hyderabadi cuisine
Telangana cuisine
Dumplings
Indian pastries
Muhajir cuisine